Hacienda San Antonio de Petrel was a Chilean hacienda located between Topocalma and Nilahue, in current Pichilemu, O'Higgins Region.

It was created in 1611 by Bartolomé de Rojas y Puebla, who owned the terrains, and who later bought more lands nearby. San Antonio de Petrel's main activity that century was the animal breeding.

In the following years, San Antonio de Petrel's income was generated by the production of leather, jerky, soles, tallow, cordovan, and animal breeding.

Its current owner is Francisco Javier Errázuriz Talavera.

References

Companies established in 1611
1611 establishments in the Captaincy General of Chile
Haciendas